Oliver Florent (born 22 July 1998) is a professional Australian rules footballer playing for the Sydney Swans in the Australian Football League (AFL). He was drafted by the Sydney Swans with their first selection and eleventh overall in the 2016 national draft. He made his debut in the twenty-eight point loss against  in the opening round of the 2017 season at the Sydney Cricket Ground.

Florent attended Mentone Grammar School. His paternal grandparents were born in Mauritius. He is the son of Australian tennis player Andrew Florent.

Florent supported Hawthorn Hawks as a junior.

Statistics
Updated to the end of the 2022 season.

|-
| 2017 ||  || 13
| 9 || 4 || 1 || 50 || 38 || 88 || 15 || 19 || 0.4 || 0.1 || 5.6 || 4.2 || 9.8 || 1.7 || 2.1 || 0
|- 
| 2018 ||  || 13
| 23 || 9 || 7 || 216 || 168 || 384 || 66 || 56 || 0.4 || 0.3 || 9.4 || 7.3 || 16.7 || 2.9 || 2.4 || 3
|-
| 2019 ||  || 13
| 21 || 6 || 6 || 248|| 156 || 404 || 78 || 43 || 0.3 || 0.3 || 11.8 || 7.4 || 19.2 || 3.7 || 2.0 || 5
|- 
| 2020 ||  || 13
| 17 || 4 || 4 || 180 || 98 || 278 || 40 || 43 || 0.2 || 0.2 || 10.6 || 5.8 || 16.4 || 2.4 || 2.5 || 2
|-
| 2021 ||  || 13
| 23 || 9 || 6 || 273 || 163 || 436 || 93 || 50 || 0.4 || 0.3 || 11.9 || 7.1 || 19.0 || 4.0 || 2.2 || 3
|- 
| 2022 ||  || 13
| 25 || 5 || 6 || 268 || 145 || 413 || 124 || 54 || 0.2 || 0.2 || 10.7 || 5.8 || 16.5 || 5.0 || 2.2 || 0
|- class=sortbottom
! colspan=3 | Career
! 118 !! 37 !! 30 !! 1235 !! 768 !! 2003 !! 416 !! 265 !! 0.3 !! 0.3 !! 10.5 !! 6.5 !! 17.0 !! 3.5 !! 2.2 !! 13
|}

Honours and achievements
Individual
 AFL Rising Star nominee: 2018 (round 11)

References

External links

1998 births
Living people
Sydney Swans players
Sandringham Dragons players
Australian rules footballers from Victoria (Australia)
Australian people of Mauritian descent
People educated at Mentone Grammar School